William Bard (April 4, 1778 – October 17, 1853) was a lawyer and pioneer in life insurance who founded the New York Life Insurance and Trust Company.

Early life
Bard was born in Philadelphia, Pennsylvania on April 4, 1778.  He was the son of cousins, Mary (née Bard) Bard and Samuel Bard, a prominent doctor who was a founder of Columbia University's medical school and physician to George Washington. His younger sister, Eliza, was the wife of John McVickar, the First Rector of St. James Church in Hyde Park and professor at Columbia University.

His paternal grandparents were Suzanne (née Valleau) Bard, a granddaughter and heiress of Pierre Fauconnier, and John Bard, a friend of George Washington and Benjamin Franklin who had invested in Hyde Park, then a 3,600 acre plantation.

William graduated from Columbia College, in 1798 and began the study of law under Judge Maturin Livingston, the former Recorder of New York City.

Career
After his marriage in 1820, they moved to Hyde Park where his father had transferred a large portion of his estate, together with a considerable fortune that his wife received from her grandmother, Madame du Nully of San Croix.  Around 1826, Bard sold their estate in Hyde Park to David Hosack (the doctor who tended to the fatal injuries of Alexander Hamilton after his duel with Aaron Burr in July 1804) and moved to Manhattan, before eventually settling in Staten Island where he purchased a large piece of property becoming the first of his family to reside on Staten Island.  There he built a large house in West New Brighton, located on the north shore of the island, at Bard Ave. (which was named for him) and Delafield Place.  He was offered the position of president of Columbia College, but declined the offer.

He later founded the New York Life Insurance and Trust Company, which was the first insurance company in New York, and served as its first president. After his retirement in 1847, he was succeeded by Morris Franklin, who served as president from 1848 until his death in 1885.

Personal life
On October 7, 1802, Bard was married to Catherine Cruger (1781–1868) at Trinity Church in Manhattan. Catherine was the daughter of Ann (née du Nully) Cruger and Nicholas Cruger (brother of Henry Cruger), a slave-trader in St. Croix, West Indies. Together, they were the parents of fourteen children, eight of whom lived to adulthood:

 Samuel Bard (1803–1883), who died unmarried.
 Anne Bard (1804–1834), who married Edward Prime (1801–1883), son of Nathaniel Prime, in 1827.
 Caroline Bard (1806–1883), who died unmarried.
 Susan Bard (1812–1838), who married Ferdinand Sands (1806–1839), a grandson of Comfort Sands.
 Eliza Bard (1813–1902), who married Rufus King Delafield (1802–1874), brother of merchants Richard Delafield and Edward Delafield.
 William Henry Bard (1815–1834), who died unmarried.
 John Bard (1819–1899), who founded Bard College with his wife, Margaret Taylor Johnston (1825–1875), daughter of merchant John Johnston and sister of John Taylor Johnston, founder of the Metropolitan Museum of Art.
 Mary Bard (1821–1847), who married Arthur B. Morris.

Bard died on October 17, 1853 at his home on Staten Island. He was buried in the family vault in St. Mark's Church in-the-Bowery. His widow, Catherine, died on October 14, 1868, also in Staten Island.  Their Staten Island estate in the Livingston neighborhood, which was later owned by their daughter Eliza, became the Staten Island Cricket Club.

References
Notes

Sources

External links

1778 births
1853 deaths
Lawyers from Philadelphia
New York Life Insurance Company
19th-century American lawyers
Lawyers from New York City
Columbia College (New York) alumni
People from Livingston, Staten Island